Dr Constantin Gurdgiev (Konstantin Gurdzhiyev; born 1968) is an economist and professor based in the US. He is a former editor of Business & Finance Magazine. Gurdgiev is well known in Ireland from his frequent appearances on the Tonight with Vincent Browne television show on TV3 during the great recession. Gurdgiev identifies as a left-libertarian.

Early life
Gurdgiev was born in Moscow in 1968. He holds a PhD in Macroeconomics and Finance from Trinity College, Dublin, an MA in Economics from Johns Hopkins University.

Professional career
Gurdgiev was a Professor of Finance (Visiting) at Middlebury Institute of International Studies at Monterey (2016–2019). He is also an adjunct lecturer in Finance with Trinity College, Dublin and has lectured in Economics at University College Dublin and Johns Hopkins University. In September 2006, he became the editor of Business & Finance Magazine. He left the post in March 2008, and joined NCB Stockbrokers, but continued at the magazine as an editorial advisor and contributor.

He is a frequent contributor to international media (TV, radio and print) and posted regular columns in the Cayman Financial Review, Slon.ru (in Russian), Decision Ireland, and the Village Magazine. Gurdgiev was ranked second on the "UK & Ireland Economists Top 100" list by City A.M.

In the past, Gurdgiev served as the Partner and Head of Research with St Columbanus AG, the Head of Macroeconomics with the Institute for Business Value, IBM, and Director of Research with NCB Stockbrokers. He WAS (2009-2015) the chairman of the Ireland–Russia Business Association.

Gurdgiev frequently contributes to economic and social policy debate in Ireland and Europe. He is a regular guest on Tonight with Vincent Browne on TV3.

In May 2011, Gurdgiev set up a Swiss fund management company called St. Columbanus AG with businessman and political activist Declan Ganley.

His areas of specialty include macroeconomic risk and strategy research and thought leadership.

References

External links
 
 True Economics The Constantin Gurdgiev blog
 Constantin Gurdgiev LinkedIn
 Constantin Gurdgiev: our celtic unicorn economy Village Magazine, 8 December 2011
 Retail@Google 2015: Is the Future of Retail Borderless? – Dr. Constantin Gurdgiev via YouTube

1970 births
Living people
Academics of Trinity College Dublin
Alumni of Trinity College Dublin
Economy of the Republic of Ireland
Irish broadcast news analysts
20th-century Irish economists
Irish libertarians
Irish magazine editors
Johns Hopkins University alumni
Libertarian economists
Economists from Moscow
Russian emigrants to Ireland
University of California, Los Angeles alumni